Vellinakshatram may refer to:
 Vellinakshatram (magazine), a film magazine published in Malayalam by the Kalakaumudi publications
 Vellinakshatram (1949 film), a Malayalam film produced under Udaya Studios
 Vellinakshatram (2004 film), a Malayalam horror film directed by Vinayan